Georgian House may refer to:

Georgian House, Bristol
The Georgian House, Edinburgh
The Georgian House, British children's television series

See also
Georgian architecture
Architecture of Georgia (country)